David Nieper Academy is a co-educational secondary school and sixth form located in Alfreton in the English county of Derbyshire.

History
The school first opened on 16 March 1939, by Alderman W. Mortimer Wilson, MA, whose name went on to be borne by the school for close on 70 years. The school opened as a non-selective establishment with two separate schools within, the boys and girls being educated separately. The first headmaster of the boys' school was Wilfred Dawes and the headmistress of the girls' school was Miss Cresswell. After the Second World War four houses were introduced named Brindley, Nightingale, Royce and Stephenson.

The school became a comprehensive in the late 1960s. Miss Cresswell then retired and Mr Dawes took full control of the school. During his time as headmaster the school was recognised as a modal for the comprehensive system. In recognition of his achievements, Wilfred Dawes was appointed O.B.E. for his services to Education. He was a strong Socialist and supporter of the comprehensive system.

The school gained specialist Arts College status in 2008 and was renamed Alfreton Grange Arts College.

On 22, July 2013, the headteacher, Gail Giles was suspended pending investigation from the governing body. Then two months later in September 2013 the school was deemed inadequate by Ofsted and the school was placed into special measures.

Previously a community school administered by Derbyshire County Council, in September 2016 Alfreton Grange Arts College converted to academy status and renamed David Nieper Academy. In preparation for the conversion, In April 2016, Kathryn Hobbs was named the new Headteacher of the school.

The name of the school has changed many times over the years. Originally in 1939 it was named "Alfreton Central Elementary School", in 1944 it became known as "Alfreton Secondary Modern School", on 1 September 2008, the school changed its name from "Mortimer Wilson School" to "Alfreton Grange Arts College'"and then in 2016 it became "The David Nieper Academy".

Notable former pupils
 Joe Bennett - Technical editor of Total Guitar magazine

References

External links

Educational institutions established in 1939
1939 establishments in England
Secondary schools in Derbyshire
Alfreton
Academies in Derbyshire